Rendampulikadu is a village in the Pattukkottai taluk of Thanjavur district, Tamil Nadu, India.

Demographics 

As per the 2001 census, Rendampulikadu had a total population of 1115 with 572 males and 543 females. The sex ratio was 949. The literacy rate was 69.82.

References 

 

Villages in Thanjavur district